The following is an incomplete list of wars fought by Slovenia, by its people or regular armies during periods when Slovene states (whether constituent or sovereign) existed, from antiquity to the present day.

The list gives the name, the date, combatants, and the result of these conflicts following this legend:



19th Century

World War I

World War II

Since World War II

Peacekeeping missions

References 

Military history of Slovenia
Foreign relations of Slovenia
Slovenia
Wars